Laimdota Straujuma (born 24 February 1951) is a Latvian economist who was the Prime Minister of Latvia from January 2014 to February 2016. Before her tenure as Prime Minister, she served as Minister of Agriculture from 2011 to 2014. She was the first woman to serve as the head of government of the country. After her resignation on 7 December 2015, she announced her intention to resume a seat in the Saeima.

Between October 2000 and 2006, Straujuma served as the Secretary of State of the Ministry for Agriculture. Between 2007 and 2010, she was the Secretary of State of the Ministry for Regional Development and Local Government. She was appointed as Minister of Agriculture on 25 October 2011.

On 5 January 2014, the Unity Party nominated Straujuma as a candidate for the post of Prime Minister following the resignation of Valdis Dombrovskis. The nomination was supported by Unity's coalition partners, the Reform Party and the National Alliance, as well as the opposition Union of Greens and Farmers.

Following the 2014 parliamentary election, in which the Unity Party came in second, the President of Latvia Andris Bērziņš nominated Straujuma to lead the new government, which was approved by Saeima on 5 November 2014. Straujuma resigned on 7 December 2015.

Resignation
On 7 December 2015, Straujuma resigned after a period of increasing disputes within the ruling coalition. As the country’s first female prime minister, her term lasted nearly two years and her tenure focused on strengthening national defence in the wake of the Russian annexation of Crimea. Media reports claimed Straujuma struggled to maintain cohesion within the coalition in the months preceding her resignation over the overwhelming issues of the European migrant crisis, teacher strikes and disagreement over strategy for State assistance to the debt-laden national airline Air Baltic. Reallocation of funds to ensure the country moved closer to NATO's 2% GDP defence spending requirement in light of the security situation helped make the 2016 budget controversial. The chairwoman of the Unity Party Solvita Āboltiņa criticised Straujuma’s alleged lack of authority. Straujuma upon her resignation stated that there was a need in the government for “new ideas, a new contribution and a new energy”. She personally recommended incumbent Interior Minister Rihards Kozlovskis as a successor. He later declined the role in an interview with Radio Latvia.

See also
First Straujuma cabinet
Second Straujuma cabinet

References

External links

Cabinet profile

|-

1951 births
Living people
People from Ludza Municipality
People's Party (Latvia) politicians
New Unity politicians
Prime Ministers of Latvia
Ministers of Agriculture of Latvia
Deputies of the 12th Saeima
Women prime ministers
Women government ministers of Latvia
University of Latvia alumni
21st-century Latvian women politicians
Women deputies of the Saeima